Panic is a sudden, overwhelming fear.

Panic may also refer to:

Arts and entertainment

Films

 Panic (1928 film), a German film directed by Harry Piel 
 Panic (1946 film), also known as Panique, 1946 French film by Julien Duvivier
 Panic (1963 film), a British crime film
 Panic (1977 film), also known as Panique, 1977 Canadian film by Jean-Claude Lord
 Panic (1982 film), an Italian / Spanish film directed by Tonino Ricci
 Panic (2000 film), a film starring William H. Macy
 PANICS, a 2005 machinima film

Music

Performers
 Black Flag (band), originally named Panic, a punk rock group
 Dave_Mustaine#Panic, rock band formed in 1981, the first band of Dave Mustaine, later of Metallica and Megadeth
 The Panics, a rock band from Australia
 A common abbreviation for Panic! at the Disco, an alternative rock band from the United States

Albums
 Panic (Caravan Palace album), a 2012 Caravan Palace album
 Panic (Circle album), a 2007 album by the Finnish rock band Circle
 Panic (From Ashes to New album), a 2020 album by From Ashes to New
 Panic (MxPx album), a 2005 album by MxPx
 The Panics (EP 1), a 2002 EP by The Panics
 The Panics (EP 2), a 2002 EP by The Panics

Songs
 Panic (Birtwistle), a 1995 composition for alto saxophone, jazz drum kit and orchestra by Harrison Birtwistle
 "Panic" (From Ashes to New song), a 2020 song by From Ashes to New
 "Panic" (The Smiths song), a 1986 song by The Smiths
 "Panic" (Sublime with Rome song), a 2011 song by Sublime with Rome from Yours Truly
 "Panic", a song by Anthrax from the 1984 album Fistful of Metal
 "Panic", a song by Backstreet Boys from the 2007 album Unbreakable
 "Panic", a song by No Doubt from the 2003 album Everything in Time
 "Panic/Tainted Love", a 1985 single by Coil, from the album Scatology

Other arts and entertainment
 Panic (comics), a 1950s EC Comic
 Panic, a character in the Disney film Hercules (1997) and the associated TV series
 Panic! (video game), a 1993 video game for Sega CD
 Panic: The Story of Modern Financial Insanity, a non-fiction book by Michael Lewis
 Panic (novel), a 2005 thriller by Jeff Abbott
 Panic (play), a 1935 play by Archibald MacLeish
 "Panic" (Dead Zone), an episode of the TV series Dead Zone
 Panic! (TV series), a 1950s TV anthology series
 Panic (TV series), a teen drama television series

Computing 
 Panic Inc, an American Mac software and video game company based in Portland, Oregon.
 Kernel panic, a fatal error condition associated with Unix-like computer operating systems
 Panic (demo), a 1992 PC demo by Future Crew

Politics, psychology, and sociology  
 Bank run, when a large number of bank customers withdraw their deposits because they believe the bank is, or might become, insolvent
 Financial crisis, a variety of situations in which some financial institutions or assets suddenly lose a large part of their value
 Mass hysteria, the manifestation of the same or similar hysterical symptoms by more than one person
 Moral panic
 PANIC (Prevent AIDS Now Initiative Committee), the activist group behind the 1986 initiative statute California Proposition 64 (1986)

Other uses
 Panic, Pennsylvania, a community in the United States
 Panic, a village in Hereclean Commune, Sălaj County, Romania
 Panić, an ethnic Serbian surname